Ghinar (also Romanized as Ghīnar and Gheynar; also known as ‘Eynar, Ghīnan, Kenār, and Kinār) is a village in Qarah Kahriz Rural District, Qarah Kahriz District, Shazand County, Markazi Province, Iran. At the 2006 census, its population was 1,821, in 482 families.

References 

Populated places in Shazand County